Aleš Ryška (born 16 February 1972) is a retired Czech football defender.

References

1972 births
Living people
Czech footballers
SK Sigma Olomouc players
MFK Karviná players
FC Fastav Zlín players
FC Vysočina Jihlava players
1. SK Prostějov players
FC Hradec Králové players
SK Hanácká Slavia Kroměříž players
Association football defenders
Czech First League players